The Florida Atlantic Owls football team represents Florida Atlantic University in college football at the NCAA Division I Football Bowl Subdivision (FBS) level as a member of the East Division of Conference USA (C-USA). The program has had seven head coaches, including two interim head coaches, since it began play during the 2001 season. The current head coach of the Owls is Willie Taggart, who was hired in December 2019. Taggart was previously the head coach of Florida State, Oregon, South Florida, and Western Kentucky. While coaching Western Kentucky in 2011, he won the first game played at FAU Stadium. 

Through the 2021 season, Florida Atlantic has played 254 games over 21 seasons. Four head coaches have led the Owls in postseason bowl games: Howard Schnellenberger, Lane Kiffin,  Glenn Spencer, and Taggart. Florida Atlantic has a 4–1 record in bowl games. The Owls have won three conference championships. Schellenberger's 2007 team shared the Sun Belt Conference titles. Kiffin's 2017 team and 2019 team won C-USA titles.

Schellenberger spent the most seasons (11) as the Owl's head coach and has the most wins (58) and most losses (74) in program history. Kiffin, who led the Florida Atlantic to a record of 27–13 from 2017 to 2019, has the highest winning percentage (.675) of any non-interim coach. The lowest winning percentage for any Florida Atlantic coach is Charlie Partridge, who compiled a record of 9–27 (.250) from 2014 to 2016.

Kiffin led the Owls to two bowl appearances, the first a 50–3 win over Arkon in the 2017 Boca Raton Bowl. Kiffin's 2019 team was invited to the 2019 Boca Raton Bowl. Led by interim head coach Glenn Spencer, the Owls won 52–28 win over SMU. Kiffin left to become the head coach of Ole Miss before the 2019 bowl game.

Head coaches

Key

List of head coaches

Notes

References

Florida Atlantic

Florida Atlantic Owls football coaches